The  Shri Katas Raj Temples (Punjabi) (Sanskrit: कटासराज) also known as Qila Katas, is a complex of several Hindu temples connected to one another by walkways. The temple complex surrounds a pond named Katas which is regarded as sacred by Hindus. The complex is located in the Potohar Plateau region of Pakistan's Punjab province. The temples are located in municipal committee Choa Saidanshah, and are near the M2 Motorway.

The temples' pond is said in the Puranas to have been created from the teardrops of Shiva, after he wandered the Earth inconsolable after the death of his wife Sati. The pond occupies an area of two kanals and 15 marlas, with a maximum depth of 20 feet. 

The temples play a role in the Hindu epic poem, the Mahābhārata, where the temples are traditionally believed to have been the site where the Pandava brothers spent a significant portion of their exile.  It is also traditionally believed by Hindus to be the site where the brothers engaged in a riddle contest with the Yakshas, as described in the Yaksha Prashna.  Another tradition states that the Hindu deity Krishna laid the foundation of the temple, and established a hand-made shivling in it.

The temples were visited by India's former deputy prime minister Lal Krishna Advani in 2005. In 2006, the Pakistani government began restoration works at the temples, with further improvements announced in 2017.

Location

The Katas Raj Temple complex is part of municipal committee Choa Saidanshah. The Katas Raj Temple complex is located near Kallar Kahar, and is located at an altitude of 2,000 feet. It is approximately 100 kilometres away by road from another important Hindu pilgrimage destination - the Tilla Jogian complex. Katas Raj is located near the interchange for the town of Kallar Kahar off the M2 Motorway which links Islamabad to Lahore. The complex is located alongside the road that connects Kallar Kahar to Choa Saidan Shah near the village of Dulmial.

Etymology
The name of the temple complex is believed to derive from the Sanskrit word kataksha, meaning "tearful eyes." The pond was originally referred to as Viskund, or "poison spring", but was later referred to as Amarkund, Chamaskund, and finally Katakshkund, meaning "Spring of tearful eyes." The pond in Urdu and Persian is referred to as Chashm-e-Alam, meaning "Sorrowful/Tearful Eyes."

History

Prehistoric
The Salt Ranges have archaeological remains still hidden underground.  A number of bones of the limbs and vertebrae of animals have been found at some nearby sites. Prehistoric axes and knives made of granite, and artifacts like terracotta bangles and pottery have also been unearthed at the Katasraj site. The latter have been found to be similar to those excavated in Harappa, but have not been dated.

Hindu tradition holds that the temples date from the era of the Mahabharata, and is believed to be where the Pandava brothers spent a large portion of their exile. It is also believed by Hindus to be the site where the Pandavas engaged in a riddle contest with the Yakshas, as described in the Yaksha Prashna.

Founding

The 4th century CE Chinese monk, Faxian, described a temple at Katas Raj in his travelogues. The 7th century CE Chinese traveler Xuanzang visited the area and reported the existence of a Buddhist stupa dating to the era of the 3rd century BCE Indian emperor, Ashoka the great. The stupa was reported to be 200 feet tall, and surrounded by 10 springs. Simhapura (also Singhapura or Sinhapura) Buddhist kingdom, mentioned and visited by Xuanzang, has been identified with Katas Raj by Alexander Cunningham in his book The Ancient Geography of India.

Following the collapse of the empire of Gandhara, Hinduism gained traction in the region under the reign of the Hindu Shahis beginning around the 7th century CE. The Hindu Shahis established Hindu temples at Katas Raj from the mid 7th to 10th centuries, though the British engineer Alexander Cunningham dated the shrines to around 66 BCE. The Hindu Shahi empire also  funded construction of several other temples throughout northern Punjab and the Potohar plateau, including the nearby Tilla Jogian, and Kafir Kot in Khyber Pakhtunkhwa province.

Early

The founder of the Sikh faith, Guru Nanak, is believed to have visited the Katas Raj Temples, as the site became a popular destination for ascetics. The Sikh emperor Ranjit Singh also regularly performed pilgrimage to the site. He visited the site for the  Vaisakhi festival in 1806, in December 1818, and again in 1824.

The complex was a popular pilgrimage site for Hindus prior to the 1947 Partition of British India, with large numbers visiting for Shivratri. Following Partition, the local Hindu community left the region for India. The relationship of Hindus with local Muslim population was good, and local Muslims accompanied Hindus to the nearby town of Choa Saiden Shah, from where the local Hindu population departed for India. Indian pilgrims continued to visit the temple for the Shivratri festival until the Indo-Pakistani War of 1965, after which Indian pilgrims were barred from visiting again until 1984.

Modern
The temples fell into disrepair over the decades following Partition, and suffered neglect. Pakistani Hindus would continue to occasionally visit the site, but were unable to maintain the expansive complex.  The pond was polluted with litter, while local villagers would also use the pool for recreation. Indian Hindu pilgrims were forbidden to visit the site in 1956, 1960, and after the Indo-Pakistan war in 1965. India pilgrims were not permitted to visit the site again until 1984.

India's former Deputy Prime Minister Lal Krishna Advani visited the temples in 2005, and expressed displeasure at the site's dilapidated state. In 2005 Pakistan proposed to restore the temple complex, while in 2006 the restoration project began in order to clean the sacred pond, paint and restore some temples, and installation of informational blue boards around the temple complex. 300 Indian Hindus visited the site for the Shivratri festival in 2006, which for a short time became an annual tradition for some Indian pilgrims, though Indians stopped coming after the 2008 Mumbai attacks. 2,000 Pakistani Hindus resumed the tradition of celebrating Shivratri at the temple in 2010, and another 2,000 in 2011 with visitors coming from as far as Karachi. A wedding for Hindu couples was arranged during that year's Shivratri festival for couples from Khyber Pakhtunkhwa province whose families had lost much of their property in the 2010 Pakistan floods.

In January 2017, Pakistan's government began installation of shikharas on the temples. In February 2017, 200 pilgrims from India traveled to the temple to participate in the Katas Raj Dham festival. In 2018, Pakistan issued visas to 139 Indian Hindu pilgrims to visit Katas Raj dham.

Religious significance

The temples are considered to be the second most sacred site in the historic Punjab region, after the temple at Jwalamukhi in modern Himachal Pradesh.

The temples derive their holiness from the legend that following the death of his wife Sati, the Hindu god Shiva wandered inconsolably, while some of his tears collected in two ponds, one of which is the pond around which the Katas Raj Temples are set, while the other is at Pushkar, near the famous Sufi pilgrimage center of Ajmer. Another version of the legend mentions the two pools at Katasraj and Nainital. Another version of the Shiva legend involves the death of Shiva's horse Katas instead of that of Sati his consort.

The Katasraj temple complex is traditionally believed to date back to the Mahabharata era. Many legends are associated with the temples. The five Pandava brothers, mentioned in the Mahabharata, are said to have stayed here for a large part of their exile. The complex is traditionally believed to be the site where the Pandava brothers were challenged by the Yaksha before being able to drink from the pond. Four of the brothers failed and were rendered lifeless by the Yaksha. The fifth brother, Yudhishthira, engaged the Yaksha in a riddle contest and defeated him with his wisdom, thereby bringing his brothers back to life.

Some legends also state that the very first Shiva Ling (Shiv-Ling) was in Katas. Some old manuscripts also consider Katas as the Janam Bhoomi (birthplace) of Hindu incarnation Rama, as well as that of Ayodhya; but this has become quite controversial. The oral tradition by local Hindus never mentioned it as being Rama's birthplace or celebrated in annual rituals.

Sacred pond
The pond in the complex is believed by Hindus to be filled with Shiva's tears after the death of his wife Sati. The water in the pond is of high clarity. The water and are believed to wash one of ones own sins, as the pond is associated with Shiva. In 2012, and again in 2017, water levels in the pond were noted to decrease because of water usage at a nearby cement factory, as well as the plantation of water-avid eucalyptus trees, that had lowered the area's water table. After the 2012 episode, the local cement factory was shut down by government authorities in order to restore water levels.

Architecture

The Katas site houses the Satgraha, a group of seven ancient temples, remains of a Buddhist stupa, five other medieval temples, havelis scattered around a pond considered holy by Hindus.

The temples at Katas are mostly constructed on square platforms. The elevation of the sub shrines seems to form a series of cornices with small rows of pillars, crowned by a ribbed dome. The seven temples were built in an architectural style similar to Kashmiri temples, with dentils, fluted pillars, trefoil arches, and rooflines that are pointed.

Ramachandra Temple
The Ramachandra Mandir is situated to the east of the Hari Singh Haveli and is closed from all sides except for an entrance on the east. The double-storied structure has eight rooms of various dimensions on the ground floor and a staircase at the south leading to the first floor. The mandir has two jharokas (balconies) that have been severely damaged.

Hanuman Temple
The Hanuman Mandir is on the western extreme of a high rectangular enclosure with entrances on the south and the north. The temple's ceiling is undecorated, and lime-plastered.

Shiva Temple
The Shiva temple is also built on a square platform. Its entrance is a recessed round arch with faint cusps and a rectangular opening to the north.

Hari Singh Nalwa Fort and Haveli

A small fort cum residence was built during the reign of Hari Singh Nalwa, and was built for his use as a fort and residence. The fort itself is located on a small hillock and overlooks the entire temple complex.

The fort is rectangular and features four bastions, one in each corner of the fort. The walls are approximately 5 metres tall, and features an entryway in the western wall of the fort. The central portion of the fort features a small courtyard, around which an arched veranda is found. The interior rooms were not decorated.

Conservation
For decades the temple complex was in bad state. The holy pond was littered with garbage, while the murals inside the temples disappeared due to the ravages of time and the neglect of the authorities. The temples were visited by India's former deputy prime minister Lal Krishna Advani in 2005, and in 2006 Pakistan proposed to restore the temple complex.

Murtis (idols) of Hindu gods were placed in the seven temples, at a cost of Rs. 51.06 million. A three-member archaeological team visited India, Sri Lanka and Nepal to collect murtis of various Hindu gods.

As of 2012, the temple pond was drying up as ground water had been diverted for industrial purposes, though the local cement factory was temporarily shut down to restore water levels. In January 2017, Pakistani authorities began the installation of shikharas on the temples, and installed a water filtration system to provide potable water for pilgrims. By May 2017, water levels in the sacred pond were again noted to be falling.

In 2016, the temple hit the national limelight after its centuries-old water pond ran dry, attributed to the depletion of groundwater owing to the establishment of four major cement factories in the area. After the menace was reported, the Supreme Court of Pakistan took a suo motu notice and started hearing the case in November. During the course of proceedings, Chief Justice of Pakistan Mian Saqib Nisar remarked that cement factories were consuming water worth millions of rupees without paying their dues. He stated that taxes should be imposed on the factories and if the government would not do so, the court would take the matter into its hands.

In 2017, while hearing the case, Nisar stressed, "This temple is not just a place of cultural significance for the Hindu community, but also a part of our national heritage. We have to protect it." The bench of judges during the hearing of the case also expressed displeasure at the absence or displacing of idols from the temples, demanding to know why there were no statues in the temples of Shiri Ram and Hanuman. The bench was told that a former chairman of Evacuee Trust Property Board (ETPB) earned millions of rupees from corruption [during his tenure] and then ran away [from Pakistan].

In May 2018, the top court announced its verdict on the case by ruling that the cement factories would have to source water from elsewhere immediately, and in the meantime, pay the Government of Punjab, Pakistan for the water they draw.  It told Bestway and DG Khan cement factories to fulfill their water needs from any other alluvial source such as river Jhelum.

However, the factories disobeyed court orders and the authorities in August 2018, cut the water supply.  However, the fate of the temple pond is not known as of September 2018, as industrial sourcing of groundwater in the area continues by two other cement factories - Gharibwal Cement and Dandot Cement, located in the area, but outside the red zone.

Gallery

See also

 Hinduism in Pakistan
 Hinduism in Punjab, Pakistan
 Sakesar temple, 15 km away
 Rohtas Fort
 Tilla Jogian
 Nagarparkar Temples

References

External links

 Pakistan renovates Katasraj Temples
 Picture tour of Katasraj Temples
 The Temples of Katas Raj in Pictures

Hindu temples in Punjab, Pakistan
Shiva temples
History of Pakistan
Chakwal District
6th-century Hindu temples
Ruins in Pakistan